Paul Davis Ennis (born 1 February 1990) is an English footballer who plays for FC United of Manchester.

Club career
Ennis played for Stockport County in their youth team, including a spell on loan at Salford City. He was released by Stockport in 2008. Despite this setback, he continued to train at their grounds and after Stockport received funds for playing at Wembley Stadium that season, he was re-signed with a professional contract. He made his début on 21 March 2009 as part of a 4–0 defeat to Northampton Town.

In September 2009, Ennis joined Stalybridge Celtic, following a two-month trial period with Wrexham. He played 11 times for Stalybridge, mostly as a substitute, and left the club in November 2009. In January 2010, Ennis signed with Welsh Premier League side Bala Town, but left the club without making an appearance. However, after a brief return to Stalybridge for the end of the season where he played four more league games for the club, he rejoined Bala Town in August 2010. After fifteen appearances for the club, he left in February 2011 to join Droylsden. He then joined Cheadle Town in March before ending the season with Witton Albion where he scored once in his five league appearances with the club.

In July 2011 he joined Northwich Victoria. He appeared twice for feeder club Northwich Villa in the North West Counties Football League.

In March 2012 he joined Colwyn Bay.

He had a brief stint at Guiseley A.F.C. from September 2013 to November, before joining Stalybridge Celtic for a third time in his career.

In mid September 2017 he moved to Shaw Lane

In May 2019 he joined FC United of Manchester.

References

External links

Welsh Premier League profile
Stockport County profile

1990 births
People from Cheadle, Greater Manchester
Living people
Association football midfielders
English footballers
Stockport County F.C. players
Stalybridge Celtic F.C. players
English Football League players
Bala Town F.C. players
Northwich Victoria F.C. players
Witton Albion F.C. players
Droylsden F.C. players
Cheadle Town F.C. players
Northwich Villa F.C. players
Salford City F.C. players
Guiseley A.F.C. players
Colwyn Bay F.C. players
Hednesford Town F.C. players
Curzon Ashton F.C. players
Matlock Town F.C. players
Shaw Lane A.F.C. players
Ashton United F.C. players
Skelmersdale United F.C. players
Buxton F.C. players
F.C. United of Manchester players
Southport F.C. players